Nicholas Jay Mortensen (born November 4, 1977 in Green Bay, Wisconsin) is an American comedian and motivational speaker.

Biography

Mortensen spent his formative years in Green Bay, Wisconsin. He graduated from the University of Wisconsin–Green Bay in 2001 and spent time working with his father at the family-owned Jones Sign Nationwide, where he gained an appreciation of his ability to make others laugh.

While he has said his job at Jones Sign was "incredible," he regarded his position with unease, feeling it based on nepotism. Eager to see if his own talents could net him recognition, he began performing comedy in 2004 on a visit to Madison, Wisconsin. Within a year he had collaborated on a group for young stand up comedians called the WiSUC Project, short for "Wisconsin Stand-Up Comedy Project", and won their first ever comedy contest. In 2007 Mortensen moved to Madison.

Recent events
Nick ran into some trouble in June 2007 with the Madison Comedy Club as the result of a front-page article in Madison's The Capital Times where he was quoted as saying "The club here (in Madison, WI) is super cool and a pleasure to work at, but generally speaking, comedy clubs are where comedians and comedy itself goes to die." . The Madison Comedy Club subsequently canceled his future bookings with the club and erased his profile from the comedians section on their website.

Packers blog 
In November 2006, Mortensen was hired to  blog about his hometown Green Bay Packers at Packers fan blog Nitschke.

References
 Rozwadowski, Tom (December 18, 2005). "Taking Comedy Out of the Clubs".  Green Bay Press-Gazette, Section D (Life)p. 1-2.
 Comp, Nathan J. (June 8, 2006).  "[Home Grown Comedy Tickles Madison] ".
The Capital Times

External links
 Nick Mortensen's official site

American stand-up comedians
1977 births
Living people
Male actors from Wisconsin
People from Green Bay, Wisconsin
University of Wisconsin–Green Bay alumni
21st-century American comedians